Botsy is a rural locality (a selo) in Dzhidinsky District, Republic of Buryatia, Russia. The population was 550 as of 2010. There are 5 streets.

Geography 
Botsy is located 60 km southeast of Petropavlovka (the district's administrative centre) by road. Verkhny Yonkhor is the nearest rural locality.

References 

Rural localities in Dzhidinsky District